Lepreau is a civil parish in Charlotte County, New Brunswick, Canada, west of Saint John. It comprises a single local service district (LSD), which is a member of the Southwest New Brunswick Service Commission (SNBSC).

The Point Lepreau Nuclear Generating Station is the parish's most notable feature and is located near its eastern border.

The Census subdivision of Lepreau Parish shares the parish's borders.

Origin of name
Historian William Francis Ganong states that the name of the parish comes from Point Lepreau, the name being a corruption of French Pte. aux Napraux.

The parish's official spelling has varied:
LePreau in 1857,
Lepreaux in 1868, 1869, 1903, 1927, and 1952
Le Preaux in 1877 and 1896
Lepreau since 1973

History
Lepreau Parish was erected from eastern Pennfield Parish in 1857. It originally included the eastern part of Clarendon Parish.

Boundaries
Lepreau is bounded:

 on the north by a line running due west from the southernmost corner of Queens County;
 on the east by a line running true north from Point Lepreau;
 on the south by Maces Bay and the Bay of Fundy;
 on the west by true north from the mouth of the Pocologan River;
 including any islands within  of the shore.

Evolution of boundaries
Lepreau's originally extended north to the county line.

In 1868 all of the parish north of the southern point of Queens County was included in the Clarendon District, a polling district that also included the northern part of Pennfield Parish.

In 1869 The Clarendon District was erected as Clarendon Parish and Lepreau's modern boundaries were established.

Local service district
The local service district of the parish of Lepreau comprises the entire parish.

The LSD was established in 1970 to assess for fire protection; first aid & ambulance services were added in 1978.

Today the LSD assesses for only the basic LSD services of fire protection, police services, land use planning, emergency measures, and dog control.

Communities
Communities at least partly within the parish. italics indicate a name no longer in official use.

 Haggertys Cove
 Lepreau
 Little Lepreau
 Maces Bay (Old Ridge)
 Mink Brook
 New River
 New River Beach
 Pocologan
 Welch Cove

Bodies of water
Bodies of water at least partly within the parish.

 Lepreau River
 North Branch Lepreau River
 West Branch Lepreau River
 Little Lepreau River
 Little New River
 New River
 Pocologan River
 Bay of Fundy
 Maces Bay
 Lepreau Harbour
 New River Harbour
 Pocologan Harbour
 Little Lepreau Basin
 Lake of the Hills
 Ragged Falls Flowage
 more than 25 other officially named lakes

Islands
Islands at least partly within the parish. italics indicates a name no longer in official use

 Head Island
 New River Island (Mole Island)
 Pocologan Island
 Salkeld Islands (Fothergill Islands)

Other notable places
Parks, historic sites, and other noteworthy places at least partly within the parish.

 Lepreau Falls Provincial Park
 Lepreau River Wildlife Management Area
 McPhersons Point Protected Natural Area
 New River Beach Provincial Park
 New River Protected Natural Area
 Ragged Falls Protected Natural Area
 Salkeld Island Protected Natural Area

Census data

Population

Language

Access Routes
Highways and numbered routes that run through the parish, including external routes that start or finish at the parish limits:

Notes

References

External links
 Lepreau LSD Facebook page

Parishes of Charlotte County, New Brunswick